Kingdom of David: The Saga of the Israelites is a 2003 historical documentary that was produced for PBS. The documentary features original music by Erik Friedlander, and is narrated by an all-star voice-cast which includes F. Murray Abraham, René Auberjonois, Keith David, Jeremy Irons, and Derek Jacobi.

Written by Isaac Mizrahi, along with Carl Byker and Mitch Wilson who also directed the film, the film was produced by Oregon Public Broadcasting and Devillier Donegan Enterprises, and is distributed by PBS Home Video.

External links
 

Documentaries about historical events